= Gwani Kalat =

- Location within Pakistan
- Coordinates: 27.28°N 65.54°E
- Country: Pakistan
- Province: Balochistan
- Time zone: UTC+5 (PST)

Gwani Kalat, or "the fort of beautiful ladies", is a city located in Balochistan, Pakistan (27°28′0″N 65°54′0″E).
